Spectral Gene is an SRPG for the PlayStation 2, and is the next installment in Idea Factory's Spectral series. It was developed and published for Japan by Idea Factory and was released on December 13, 2007.

References

External links
The official website of Spectral Gene

2007 video games
Tactical role-playing video games
PlayStation 2 games
PlayStation 2-only games
Video games developed in Japan
Japan-exclusive video games
Idea Factory games
Single-player video games